Josh Shorter was an African-American man who was lynched in Eufaula, Alabama, or between Eufaula and Georgetown, Georgia, in early June 1881. 

The lynching is described in an article in The Weekly, a newspaper published in Georgia, on June 18, 1881: "A special telegram from Eufaula under date of the 9th, states that a moat villainous outrage was committed upon a respectable white girl, twelve years old, by Josh Shorter, a negro, near city, on Wednesday afternoon. A diligent pursuit by a large party resulted in his capture across the river in Georgia. He was immediately carried to the Alabama side, and upon the Sheriff’s attempting to get possession of him, they hurried him hack to Georgia with a large crowd and hung him to a limb of a largo tree, about midway between Eufaula and Georgetown."

The Legacy of Lynching website marks his murder as occurring in Eufaula: "name: Josh Shorter, Jun 1881; description: from riverbank about 200 yards above city bridge".

References

1881 murders in the United States
1940 in Alabama
Deaths by person in Alabama
June 1881 events
Lynching deaths in Alabama
Racially motivated violence against African Americans